Jun Kondō (近藤 淳 Kondō Jun, 6 February 1930 – 11 March 2022) was a Japanese theoretical physicist.

His research is noted for the Kondo effect. He was an emeritus fellow of the National Institute of Advanced Industrial Science and Technology (AIST). Kondō died from pneumonia on 11 March 2022, at the age of 92.

Honours and appointments
1959 Dr. of Science, University of Tokyo
1959 Research Associate, Nihon University
1960 Research Associate, Institute for Solid-State Physics, University of Tokyo
1963 Research Scientist, Electrotechnical Laboratory (ETL) [became AIST]
1968 Nishina Memorial Prize
1973 Imperial Prize of the Japan Academy
1979 Asahi Prize
1984 Fellow, ETL (dual appointment)
1987 Fritz London Memorial Prize
1990 Professor, Toho University
1995 Emeritus Professor, Toho University
1997 Member of the Japan Academy
2001–20??: Special Adviser, National Institute of Advanced Industrial Science and Technology (AIST)
2020 Order of Culture

See also
Kondo effect
Kondo insulator
Kondo model

Books available in English
Fermi surface effects: proceedings of the Tsukuba Institute, Tsukuba Science City, Japan, 27–29 August 1987 (1988)
The Physics of Dilute Magnetic Alloys (Cambridge University Press, 2012)

References

External links
Jun Kondō's web page
Kondo Effect – 40 Years after the Discovery – special issue of the Journal of the Physical Society of Japan

1930 births
2022 deaths
Japanese physicists
University of Tokyo alumni
Academic staff of Nihon University
Laureates of the Imperial Prize
Foreign associates of the National Academy of Sciences
Persons of Cultural Merit
Recipients of the Order of Culture
Scientists from Tokyo